Caroline Wozniacki was the defending champion, but she chose to participate in Luxembourg instead.

Simona Halep won the title, defeating Samantha Stosur in the final, 7–6(7–1), 6–2.

Seeds
The first four seeds received a bye into the second round.

Draw

Finals

Top half

Bottom half

Qualifying

Seeds

Qualifiers

Lucky losers
  Vera Dushevina

Qualifying draw

First qualifier

Second qualifier

Third qualifier

Fourth qualifier

References
 Main Draw
 Qualifying Draw

Kremlin Cup - Singles
2013 Women's Singles